Fiji competed at the 2012 Summer Olympics in London, United Kingdom from July 27 to August 12, 2012. This was the nation's thirteenth appearance at the Olympics, having appeared at every games since 1956 except the 1964 Summer Olympics in Tokyo, and the 1980 Summer Olympics in Moscow due to its support for the American-led boycott.

Fiji Association of Sports and National Olympic Committee sent a total of 9 athletes to the Games (6 men and 3 women) to compete in 6 sports. Among these athletes, trap shooter Glenn Kable, the oldest of the team, at age 49, and archer Robert Elder, after his eight-year absence, competed at their second Olympic games. Judoka and current Oceanic champion Josateki Naulu was the nation's first male flag bearer at the opening ceremony since 2000. Fiji, however, had to wait four more years for its first Olympic medal.

Archery

Fiji has qualified one male archer by being the second-ranked country at the 2012 Open New Zealand Championships, which doubled as the 2012 Oceanian Championships. Former Olympic athlete Robert Elder was chosen to represent Fiji. During the ranking round, Elder finished in penultimate place, out of 64 archers; therefore, he competed against South Korea's Kim Bub-Min, who placed in second. Elder almost pulled off the upset to win two of the first four sets, but he was unable to score a 10 with his final arrow during the last set, which guaranteed him a spot for the next elimination round.

Athletics

Fiji selected two athletes in the track and field after having achieved qualifying standards in their respective events (up to a maximum of 3 athletes in each event at the 'A' Standard, and 1 at the 'B' Standard): Javelin thrower Leslie Copeland guaranteed a qualifying place at the Olympics, after achieving the B-standard at the 2011 Summer Universiade Games. During the Olympics, Copeland was able to throw past several strong competitors including Latvia's Vadims Vasiljevskis, an Olympic bronze medalist in Athens. However, his throw was not sufficiently enough to advance him into the finals, finishing only in thirteenth place. Danielle Alakija, on the other hand, competed at the Olympics by a wild card. She finished sixth during the heats in the women's 400 m, which seemed farther enough to advance her into the semi-finals.

Men

Women

Judo

Fiji's Josateki Naulu was given a continental spot for being one of the highest ranked Oceania athletes, who have not yet qualified.

Shooting

Fiji has qualified a single quota place from the 2011 Oceania Shooting Championships by winning the men's trap event. Glenn Kable, being the oldest member of the delegation, was chosen to represent Fiji. He was considered to be the nation's top medal prospect, although he failed to reach the final round. Kable finished only twenty-third out of 34 competitors, as a rain delay during the second round perceived him to lose his concentration.

Men

Swimming

Fiji qualified a man and a woman through FINA's universality places, where Paul Elaisa and Matelita Buadromo were selected. A controversy had taken place in the choice of the male swimmer as Douglas Miller earned his spot to qualify at the Olympics. Paul Elaisa, however, appealed his choice to join the team. Neither of these swimmers advance into the semi-finals.

Men

Women

Weightlifting

Fiji has qualified two places for one man and one woman after competing at the 2012 Oceania Weightlifting Championships

References

External links

Nations at the 2012 Summer Olympics
2012
2012 in Fijian sport